John McDonald (May 24, 1837 – January 30, 1917) was an American soldier and politician.

Born in Dingle, County Kerry, Ireland, McDonald attended local schools.  He immigrated to the United States and enlisted in the United States Army at Boston, Massachusetts, in 1857. He joined his regiment in Arizona, and served in the Cavalry Corps of the Army of the Potomac throughout the American Civil War. After the war, McDonald was ordered to the West, where he again took part in several campaigns against Native Americans. He retired as a captain of Cavalry on July 1, 1868, for disabilities incurred in the line of service.

After his retirement from the military, McDonald settled in Maryland and was elected as a Republican to the Maryland House of Delegates in 1881. He was later elected to the Fifty-fifth Congress, and served from March 4, 1897, to March 3, 1899.  He engaged in agricultural pursuits near Potomac, Maryland, and died in Rockville, Maryland. He is interred in Union Cemetery.

References
 Retrieved on 2008-11-01

1837 births
1917 deaths
19th-century American politicians
American military personnel of the Indian Wars
Irish emigrants to the United States (before 1923)
Republican Party members of the Maryland House of Delegates
People from Dingle
People of Arizona in the American Civil War
Politicians from County Kerry
Republican Party members of the United States House of Representatives from Maryland
Union Army soldiers
United States Army officers